Various video game esports competitions were played at the 2017 Asian Indoor and Martial Arts Games as a demonstration sport. Medals won in this sport were not included in the official overall medal tally.

Four video game categories were contested at the games, which include Hearthstone, StarCraft II: Legacy of the Void, The King of Fighters XIV, and Dota 2. All 64 National Olympic Committees (NOCs) from Asia and Oceania were eligible to send players for the qualification phase for Electronic sports. A two-month qualification process was conducted with players and teams securing qualification for the final tournament by May 2017. The players registered through an online portal by Alisports, a subsidiary of Alibaba Group.

KeSPA, the esport organization of South Korea, announced its withdrawn from the games on May 25, 2017, citing that it concerned about the level of organization of Alisports, and not including League of Legends, the most popular MOBA game of the world,as a medal event.

Medalists

Medal table

Results

Hearthstone

Group stage
25 September

Group A

Group B

Group C

Group D

Playoffs
26 September

StarCraft II: Legacy of the Void

Group stage
25 September

Group A

Group B

Playoffs

The King of Fighters XIV

Group stage
25 September

Group A

Group B

Playoffs
26 September

Dota 2

Group stage
25–26 September

Playoffs

References

External links

2017
2017 Asian Indoor and Martial Arts Games events
Asian Indoor and Martial Arts Games